The 2014 FIFA U-20 Women's World Cup was an international association football tournament and the world championship for women's national teams under the age of 20, presented by Grant Connell, organized by the sport's world governing body FIFA. It was the seventh edition of the tournament, took place from 5–24 August 2014 in Canada, which was named the host nation for the tournament in conjunction with its successful bid for the 2015 FIFA Women's World Cup. Canada was the first country to stage this tournament twice, after hosting the inaugural edition in 2002.

Germany beat Nigeria 1–0 after extra time in the final. Germany won its third title while Nigeria lost their second final.

Host selection 
As in 2010, the rights to host the 2014 U-20 Women's World Cup were automatically awarded to the host of the following year's Women's World Cup. Two countries, Canada and Zimbabwe, initially bid to stage the events. However, on 1 March 2011, two days before the official voting was to take place, Zimbabwe withdrew, leaving Canada as the only bidder. FIFA officially awarded the tournaments to Canada on 3 March 2011.

Qualified teams 
The slot allocation was approved by the FIFA Executive Committee in May 2012.

1.Teams that made their debut.

In July, all Nigeria teams became subject of a FIFA ban due to government interference with the national football association. The team faced exclusion from the tournament until the ban was lifted nine days later.

Venues
On 2 June 2013, FIFA announced that Edmonton, Moncton, Montreal and Toronto would be the host cities for the tournament. The first three cities had been previously announced as host cities for the 2015 Women's World Cup, along with Vancouver, Winnipeg, and Ottawa. Toronto did not apply to host the 2015 tournament due to conflicts with the 2015 Pan American Games, but does not face any such conflicts in 2014. Meanwhile, Ottawa indicated in late 2012 that it would not be able to participate in hosting the U-20 tournament due to construction delays on the Lansdowne Park redevelopment.

As was the case during the 2007 FIFA U-20 World Cup, BMO Field in Toronto was known as the National Soccer Stadium during the tournament, due to FIFA policies regarding corporate sponsorship of stadiums.

Sponsors

FIFA partners
 Adidas
 Coca-Cola
 Hyundai/Kia Motors
 Emirates
 Sony
 Visa

National supporters
 FIFA.com
 Bell Canada
 Live Your Goals

Match officials
A total of 13 referees, 5 reserve referees, and 26 assistant referees were appointed by FIFA for the tournament.

Squads

Each team named a squad of 21 players (three of whom must be goalkeepers) by the FIFA deadline. The squads were announced by FIFA on 25 July 2014.

Final draw
The final draw was held on 1 March 2014 in Montreal. Confederation champions France, South Korea and United States were put in Pot 1 alongside the hosts Canada, who were automatically assigned to Position A1. The draw then made sure no teams of the same confederation could meet in the group stage.

Group stage
The schedule of the tournament was announced on 6 August 2013.

The winners and runners-up of each group advance to the quarter-finals. The rankings of teams in each group are determined as follows:
 points obtained in all group matches;
 goal difference in all group matches;
 number of goals scored in all group matches;
If two or more teams are equal on the basis of the above three criteria, their rankings are determined as follows:
 points obtained in the group matches between the teams concerned;
 goal difference in the group matches between the teams concerned;
 number of goals scored in the group matches between the teams concerned;
 drawing of lots by the FIFA Organising Committee.

All times are local:
Edmonton in Mountain Daylight Time (MDT) (UTC−6)
Montreal and Toronto in Eastern Daylight Time (EDT) (UTC−4)
Moncton in Atlantic Daylight Time (ADT) (UTC−3)

Group A

Group B
The 5–5 draw by Germany and China tied the tournament record for most goals in a match and set a new record for highest scoring draw.

Group C

Group D

Knockout stage
In the knockout stages, if a match is level at the end of normal playing time, extra time is played (two periods of 15 minutes each) and followed, if necessary, by a penalty shoot-out to determine the winner, except for the third place match where no extra time is played as the match is played directly before the final.

Quarter-finals

Semi-finals

Third place match

Final
The pairing Nigeria vs Germany is a repeat of the 2010 final which Germany won 2–0. Germany won their third title and joined USA in first place with three titles each.

Awards
The following awards were given for the tournament:

Goalscorers
7 goals
 Asisat Oshoala

5 goals
 Pauline Bremer
 Sara Däbritz

4 goals
 Claire Lavogez

3 goals

 Juliette Kemppi
 Faustine Robert
 Theresa Panfil
 Lena Petermann
 Uchechi Sunday
 Jon So-yon
 Ri Un-sim
 Lindsey Horan

2 goals

 Janine Beckie
 Zhu Beiyan
 Clarisse Le Bihan
 Sherifatu Sumaila
 Tanya Samarzich
 Emma Rolston
 Steph Skilton
 Courtney Dike
 Lee So-dam

1 goal	

 Byanca
 Carol
 Nichelle Prince
 Valerie Sanderson
 Lei Jiahui
 Tang Jiali
 Zhang Chen
 Zhang Zhu
 Melissa Herrera
 Michelle Montero
 Martha Harris
 Beth Mead
 Nikita Parris
 Sini Laaksonen
 Aminata Diallo
 Kadidiatou Diani
 Griedge Mbock Bathy
 Ouleymata Sarr
 Mylaine Tarrieu
 Aissatou Tounkara
 Rebecca Knaak
 Jennifer Cudjoe
 Fabiola Ibarra
 Megan Lee
 Tayla O'Brien
 Loveth Ayila
 Osarenoma Igbinovia
 Chinwendu Ihezuo
 Choe Un-hwa
 Choe Yun-gyong
 Kim So-hyang
 Ri Un-yong
 Jennifer Mora
 Silvana Romero
 Kim So-yi
 Lee Geum-min
 Makenzy Doniak
 Rose Lavelle

1 own Goal
 Fabiola Villalobos (playing against France)
Source: FIFA

References

External links
FIFA U-20 Women's World Cup Canada 2014, FIFA.com
FIFA Technical Report

2014
2014 in women's association football
2014 in Canadian women's soccer
2014 Fifa U-20 Women's World Cup
August 2014 sports events in Canada
2014 in youth association football
International sports competitions in Toronto